van Hulst is a Dutch surname. Notable people with the surname include:

Dominique Rijpma van Hulst (born 1981), Dutch singer known as Do
Elly van Hulst (born 1959), Dutch runner
Johan van Hulst (1911–2018), Dutch politician and professor
Jan van Hulst (1903–1975), Dutch resistance fighter
Wim van Hulst (born 1939), Dutch business economist

Dutch-language surnames
Surnames of Dutch origin